Favorite is a compilation album by Taiwanese singer Jolin Tsai. It was released on November 3, 2006, by Sony BMG. It contains 15 remixes of her songs previously released by Sony, three soundtrack songs from Why Me, Sweetie?! (2003), and a live medley.

Background and release 
On July 23, 2002, Tsai signed a recording contract with Sony, through which she later released three studio albums—Magic (2003), Castle (2004), and J-Game (2005), the three albums have sold more than 1.5 million, 1.5 million, and 1.2 million copies in Asia respectively. In Taiwan, the three albums have sold more than 360,000, 300,000, and 260,000 copies respectively, and each of them became the highest-selling album by a female artist and the second highest-selling album overall in their respective years of release. On February 16, 2006, Tsai signed a recording contract with EMI. On May 5, 2006, Sony BMG released for Tsai the greatest hits album, J-Top.

On November 3, 2006, Sony BMG released for Tsai the compilation album, Favorite, which contains 15 remixes of her songs previously released by Sony, three soundtrack songs—"Angel of Love", "Darkness", and "Sweetie" from Why Me, Sweetie?! (2003), and a live medley "I'm Still Your Lover / Cut Love" from the Taipei show of her J1 World Tour. The album reached number 12 and number five on the weekly album sales charts of G-Music and Five Music in its first week of release, respectively.

Critical reception 
Tencent Entertainment's Shuwa commented: "After the release of Dancing Diva, Jolin Tsai has completely become a 'darling' in the market. Sony, which had made a lot of profit from the release of the greatest hits album J-Top in May, made a commercial decision on 'live' this time. With the heat of Jolin Tsai's second world tour, this live and remix album was released. It is just a compilation of the classic J1 World Tour and previously unreleased live tracks, as well as a re-release of several old songs that had been included in film's soundtrack, it can be said that the tracks on the album were pieced together. Unfortunately, the label's tricks have long been exhausted, and didn't accepted by the market."

Track listing

Release history

References

External links 
 

2006 compilation albums
Jolin Tsai compilation albums
Sony Music Taiwan compilation albums